In molecular biology, the Aar small RNA is a small RNA (sRNA) produced by species of Acinetobacter. It was first discovered in Acinetobacter baylyi, and is located between the trpS and sucD genes. TrpS encodes tryptophanyl-tRNA-synthetase II and sucD encodes succinyl-coA-synthetase subunit alpha. Aar upregulates several mRNAs encoding proteins involved in amino acid metabolism.

See also
Bacterial small RNA

References

RNA
Non-coding RNA